Jaouad Akaddar (September 9, 1984October 20, 2012) was a Moroccan footballer. Jaouad died on 20 October 2012 after a heart attack immediately after the end of a match.

Club career
Akaddar played for Olympique Khouribga, FAR Rabat and Moghreb Tétouan before going abroad with Ahly Tripoli and Al-Raed.

International career
Akaddar represented the Morocco national team once in a 1-0 2004 African Cup of Nations qualification win over Equatorial Guinea on 6 July 2003.

References

External links
FootballDatabase Profile
National-Football-Teams Profile
Olympedia Profile

1984 births
2012 deaths
People from Khouribga
Moroccan footballers
Morocco international footballers
Moghreb Tétouan players
Al-Raed FC players
Al-Ahli Saudi FC players
Saudi Professional League players
Association football players who died while playing
Olympique Club de Khouribga players
Association football forwards
Moroccan expatriate footballers
Expatriate footballers in Egypt
Moroccan expatriate sportspeople in Egypt
Expatriate footballers in Libya
Moroccan expatriate sportspeople in Libya
Expatriate footballers in Saudi Arabia
Moroccan expatriate sportspeople in Saudi Arabia
Sport deaths in Morocco